William Castle or Castell of Rotherhithe (c.1615–1681) was a shipbuilder for the Royal Navy and occasionally for the East India Company. He is mentioned more than once in the Diary of Samuel Pepys.

Life
He was the son of William Castle (d.1649) shipwright at Redriff (now known as Rotherhithe) and his wife Margaret (d.1635). His younger brother Thomas was also a shipwright. He entered the Royal Navy in 1629 as a ship's carpenter.

Samuel Pepys first mentions Castle in 1664, commenting on the appearance of his wife.

He is buried with his parents in the floor of Bermondsey Parish Church.

Family
In 1636 he married Elizabeth. On 5 July 1663 he married (as a second wife) Martha Batten, daughter of Sir William Batten, Surveyor of the Navy.

His son William Castle died in 1696. A younger son John Castle died in 1700.

Ships of note

HMS Taunton (1654) 40-gun ship launched at Rotherhithe renamed HMS Crown in 1660
HMS Dover (1654) a 40-gun ship of the line launched at Shoreham
HMS Monmouth (1666) an 8-gun yacht launched at Rotherhithe
HMS Navy (1666) an 8-gun yacht launched at Rotherhithe
HMS Defiance (1666) a 64-gun ship of the line launched at Deptford Dockyard destroyed in a fire 1668
"Bombay Merchant" (1668) for the East India Company launched on the Thames
HMS Kitchen (1670) 8-gun yacht launched at Rotherhithe
HMS Hope (1678) 70-gun ship of the line launched at Deptford Dockyard
HMS Elizabeth (1679) 70-gun ship of the line launched at Barnard's Yard at Deptford Green on the Thames

Ships by William Castle the Younger

HMS Mordaunt (1682) 48-gun ship of the line launched at Deptford, started by father, completed by the son
HMS Griffin (1690) 28-gun ship launched at Rotherhithe
HMS Hart (1691) 10-gun ketch launched at Rotherhithe

References
 

1681 deaths
People from Rotherhithe
English shipbuilders